The Australian residential property market is the section of the Australian property market that provides rental properties by landlords to tenants. In Australia 31% of households are rented.

In 2022 the Australian residential rental market saw an annual increase in rents of 12%, the strongest increase in 14 years. Some areas have seen increases from 33% to 42% between 2020 and 2022.  In Bellingen on the NSW coast the annual rent increase at December 2021 was 48%. Across Australia the vacancy rate was 1%, when a rate below 2% is considered very competitive with affordability constraints impacting tenants. A number of sources have described the situation as a ‘rental crisis’ with low income households in particular unable to find suitable accommodation and forced to relocate, live with family or friends, live in garages or cars.

The primary reason for the rental crisis is a lack of supply due to a variety of reasons, including existing landlords selling their rental properties with a large proportion being purchased by owner-occupiers resulting in an overall reduction in the number of rental properties. Landlords switching their properties to the short term rental market such as Airbnb has also been cited as a reason for the reduction in available rental properties. Other commentators cited a lack of social housing being provided by the government, which is supported by Australian Bureau of Statistics figures which highlight between 2000 and 2020 the proportion of households renting from state/territory housing authorities has declined from 6% to 3%. The Covid-19 pandemic has also impacted the rental market with shared households reducing in size creating additional demand and city workers needing additional rooms for home offices and moving to regional areas due to the rise of remote working.

See also
Australian property market
Home ownership in Australia
Housing in Victoria

References

Real estate in Australia
Economy of Australia
Housing in Australia